The 2004 FIBA Europe Under-20 Championship for Women was the third edition of the FIBA Europe Under-20 Championship for Women. 12 teams participated in the competition, held in Vannes, France, from 23 July to 1 August 2004. Russia won their second title.

Qualification

Twenty-three national teams entered the qualifying round. They were allocated in four groups. The first three teams from groups A, B, C and the first two teams from group D qualified for the tournament, where they joined France (qualified as hosts).

Group A

|}

Group B

|}

Group C

|}

Group D

|}

Qualified teams

Preliminary round
In this round, the twelve teams were allocated in two groups of six teams each. The top four teams qualify for the Quarterfinals.

Times given below are in CEST (UTC+2).

Group A

Group B

9th – 12th place playoffs

Championship playoffs

Final standings

References

2005
2004–05 in European women's basketball
2004–05 in French basketball
International women's basketball competitions hosted by France
International youth basketball competitions hosted by France
2004 in youth sport